Rubén Angel Sierra García (born October 6, 1965) is a former Major League Baseball outfielder. Sierra goes by the nicknames El Caballo and El Indio.

Over 20 seasons, Sierra played for the Texas Rangers (1986–92, 2000–01, 2003), Oakland Athletics (1992–95), New York Yankees (1995–96, 2003–05), Detroit Tigers (1996), Cincinnati Reds (1997), Toronto Blue Jays (1997), Chicago White Sox (1998), Seattle Mariners (2002) and Minnesota Twins (2006). Sierra also signed with the Cleveland Indians at the end of 1999, but was released towards the end of spring training in March 2000.

Early life
Sierra graduated from Liceo Interamericano Castro High School in Puerto Rico in 1983, where he played baseball, basketball and volleyball.

MLB career
In November 1982, the Texas Rangers signed 17-year-old Sierra out of Puerto Rico. Sierra made his major league debut on June 1, 1986 as an outfielder and hit a home run in just his second MLB at bat becoming the first Texas Rangers player to accomplish this feat. Sierra had a decent rookie year, hitting .264 with 16 home runs and 55 RBIs.

In 1989, Sierra hit 29 home runs and led the league in RBIs (119), triples (14), slugging percentage (.543), total bases (344) and extra base hits (78), and finished second in MVP voting to Robin Yount. He went on to have 3 years with 100+ RBIs with the Rangers. In August 1992, the Rangers traded Sierra to the Oakland Athletics for José Canseco. He later played more years with the Rangers.

In 1995, the A's traded Sierra to the New York Yankees for Danny Tartabull. After helping the Yankees reach the playoffs for the first time in 14 years in 1995, Sierra was traded to the Detroit Tigers with Matt Drews for Cecil Fielder. Sierra was considered a journeyman because of playing for numerous teams during the late-1990s, including the Reds, Blue Jays, White Sox and Indians. After making a comeback with the Rangers in late 2000, he would go on to achieve moderate success with the Rangers in 2001, winning AL Comeback Player of the Year, and Mariners in 2002. In 2003, during Sierra's third stint with the Rangers, he was traded back to the Yankees, who were looking for a power-hitter off the bench. Sierra was an important part of the 2004 Yankees, a team that hit over 240 home runs.  Sierra himself slugged 17 of those homers as the usual designated hitter, playing in 56 games at the position.

In Game 4 of the 2004 American League Division Series, with the Yankees down to the Minnesota Twins 5–2, Sierra hit a 3-run home run to tie the game at 5–5 off of reliever Juan Rincón. His clutch home run helped the Yankees rally to win the game and the series. However, he was the final out of Game 7 of the 2004 American League Championship Series, hitting a ground ball to Pokey Reese, which secured the dramatic comeback victory of the Boston Red Sox. Sierra had an injury-plagued 2005 season and was let go by the Yankees after hitting just 4 home runs in 61 games. In 2006, Sierra signed a minor league contract with the Minnesota Twins, but was released on July 10. In August, Sierra was offered a chance to sign on with the New York Mets for the September run and playoffs. However, due to family issues (illness to his mother), he opted not to play again in 2006.

In January 2007, Sierra signed a minor league contract with the Mets, who invited him to spring training. However, on March 20, he requested and was granted his release by the team after being reassigned the previous Thursday.

See also
List of Major League Baseball career home run leaders
List of Major League Baseball career hits leaders
List of Silver Slugger Award winners at outfield
List of Major League Baseball career doubles leaders
List of Major League Baseball career runs scored leaders
List of Major League Baseball career runs batted in leaders
List of Major League Baseball annual runs batted in leaders
List of Major League Baseball annual triples leaders

References

External links

1965 births
Living people
American League All-Stars
American League RBI champions
Atlantic City Surf players
Burlington Rangers players
Chicago White Sox players
Cincinnati Reds players
Columbus Clippers players
Detroit Tigers players
Fort Myers Miracle players
Gulf Coast Rangers players
Major League Baseball designated hitters
Major League Baseball left fielders
Major League Baseball right fielders
Mexican League baseball right fielders
Minnesota Twins players
New York Yankees players
Oakland Athletics players
Oklahoma City 89ers players
Oklahoma RedHawks players
Langosteros de Cancún players
Major League Baseball players from Puerto Rico
Norfolk Tides players
Puerto Rican expatriate baseball players in Canada
Puerto Rican expatriate baseball players in Mexico
Rochester Red Wings players
Seattle Mariners players
Silver Slugger Award winners
Sportspeople from San Juan, Puerto Rico
Syracuse SkyChiefs players
Texas Rangers players
Toronto Blue Jays players
Tulsa Drillers players